Sorihuela del Guadalimar is a municipality located in the province of Jaén, Spain. According to the 2005 census (INE), the municipality has a population of 1258 inhabitants.

References

Municipalities in the Province of Jaén (Spain)